Julia Yurevich is a beauty pageant contestant who is represented Bulgaria in Miss World 2008 in South Africa. She studied Communications and Technology in Sofia.

Nationality

She was born in Kozloduy, Bulgaria, but her parents are Russian (some websites claim that her parents are Ukrainian). Her father comes from Ukraine.

References

1989 births
Living people
Miss World 2008 delegates
Bulgarian beauty pageant winners
Bulgarian people of Russian descent